Mohamed El Sayed Mohamed El Shenawy Gomaa (born 22 December 1988) is an Egyptian professional footballer who plays for Al Ahly and the  Egyptian national football team as a goalkeeper.

He began his career as a youth player with Al Ahly but was released in 2009, joining Tala'ea El Gaish. He spent time on loan with Haras El Hodoud before joining Petrojet in 2013. He returned to Al Ahly in July 2016 and then displaced Sherif Ekramy; he is considered one of the best goalkeepers in Africa. he helped the club to win 4 consecutive Egyptian Premier League titles seasons 2016–17, 2017–18, 2018–19 and 2019–20  and 2 consecutive CAF Champions League titles seasons 2019–20 and 2020–21

He made his international debut for Egypt in March 2018 in a friendly match. He was selected as the starting goalkeeper for their squad at the 2018 FIFA World Cup, playing in their opening two matches.

Club career
El Shenawy began his career in the youth system at his hometown club El Hamoul SC before moving to Al Ahly, joining the club at the age of fourteen in 2002. He failed to make a league appearance for the senior squad before being released by the club in 2009. Following his release, he joined fellow Egyptian Premier League side Tala'ea El Gaish. During his time with El Gaish, El Shenawy spent time on loan with Haras El-Hodood.

El Shenawy joined Petrojet in 2013. His form during the 2015–16 season, keeping a joint league-high eleven clean sheets in twenty-two appearances, including a run of seven matches without conceding, led his former club Al Ahly to attempt to resign him after attracting the attention of manager Martin Jol.

He rejoined Al Ahly in July 2016, establishing himself in the first team over Sherif Ekramy after keeping five clean sheets in seven matches during January 2018, including helping the side to a 1–0 victory over Al-Masry in the 2017 Egyptian Super Cup. He also recorded the highest percentage of clean sheets by any goalkeeper in the Egyptian Premier League. In his first four seasons, he helped the club win the Egyptian Premier League in consecutive seasons. He also won the 2019–20 CAF Champions League to participate in the 2020 FIFA Club World Cup, in which he managed in the 3rd place playoff, to save two penalties in the 3–2 penalty shootout win over Palmeiras, as the game ended 0–0 after 90 minutes and extra time.

International career
For the national team, El Shenawy represented Egypt at the under-18 level and later played for the Egypt national under-20 football team in the 2007 African Youth Championship. From 2013, he received several call-ups to the senior Egypt side before making his international debut in a 2–1 friendly defeat against Portugal. He earned praise for his performance in the match, with national team goalkeeping coach Ahmed Nagy commenting "He had a great game; I am so happy with his performance He deserves to be with the national team."

In May 2018, he was named in Egypt’s preliminary squad for the 2018 FIFA World Cup in Russia. He played in warm up friendly matches against Colombia and Belgium prior to the tournament and was chosen as the starting goalkeeper for their opening match of the tournament against Uruguay, winning only his fourth cap, ahead of Essam El-Hadary and club teammate Ekramy. He was named Man of the Match in the first match after making several saves during a 1–0 defeat however, he declined to accept the award in the players' tunnel after the match due to its sponsorship by Budweiser and was only photographed with the award.
As a Muslim, El Shenawy is forbidden from drinking alcohol. Teammate Ekramy and Egyptian team director Ihab Leheta later attempted to persuade him to accept the award as a "historic" prize, but he again refused.

He retained his place for Egypt's second group match as they were eliminated after suffering a 3–1 defeat to hosts Russia. He played in the African Cup of Nations in 2022, making it to the final where they lost to Senegal.

Career statistics

Club

International
Statistics accurate as of match played 27 September 2022.

Honours and achievements
Al Ahly

 Egyptian Premier League: 2007–08, 2016–17, 2017–18, 2018–19, 2019–20
 Egypt Cup: 2016–17, 2019–20
 Egyptian Super Cup: 2017, 2018, 2021
 CAF Champions League: 2019–20, 2020–21
 CAF Super Cup: 2021 (May), 2021 (Dec)
 FIFA Club World Cup Third-Place: 2020

Individual
 African Inter-Club Player of the Year: 2022

References

External links

Profile at the Al Ahly SC website

1988 births
Living people
Egyptian footballers
Egypt international footballers
Association football goalkeepers
Petrojet SC players
Egyptian Premier League players
People from Kafr El Sheikh Governorate
2018 FIFA World Cup players
Al Ahly SC players
Tala'ea El Gaish SC players
Haras El Hodoud SC players
2019 Africa Cup of Nations players
Footballers at the 2020 Summer Olympics
2021 Africa Cup of Nations players
Olympic footballers of Egypt